The KAB-500Kr (Correctable air bomb - 500 kg) is an electro-optical TV-guided fire and forget bomb developed by the Soviet Air Force in the 1980s. It remains in service with the CIS and various export customers.

The KAB-500Kr is analogous to the American GBU-15 weapon.

The seeker employs a gimballed daylight television imaging sensor under a wide angle glass dome. Unlike the earlier US GBU-8 HOBOS and AGM-65 Maverick which employed contrast lock technology, the -Kr series guidance system employs Scene Matching Area Correlation technology more akin to the US Navy DAMASK seeker or Tomahawk DSMAC. This results in the ability to attack low contrast targets by exploiting the contrast of nearby terrain features or objects.

The KAB-500-OD variant is equipped with a fuel-air explosive warhead. The technology of KAB-500Kr is also used for larger bombs, such as KAB-1500Kr based on the 1500 kg class FAB-1500 iron bomb.
There is also the training bomb KAB-500Kr-U.

The KAB-500S-E is a version with satellite guidance.

References 

Cold War aerial bombs of the Soviet Union
Aerial bombs of Russia
Guided bombs
Modern thermobaric weapons of Russia
Military equipment introduced in the 1980s